Les Enfoirés (French, 'The Tossers' or 'The Bastards') is the name given to the singers and performers in the yearly charity concert for the Restaurants du Cœur (Les Restos du Cœur).

Here is a list of the participating artists, sportsmen and personalities:

Artists 
The names of the participants of the Enfoirés concerts are never revealed by the organizers before the concerts.

Sportspeople

Regular participants 

List of artists and other notable people who participated 10 times or more in the annual shows Les Restos du Cœur

References 

French musical groups